"I'll Cry for You" is a 1991 single released by the Swedish heavy metal band Europe. It was the second single from the band's album Prisoners in Paradise, and charted at number 28 in the United Kingdom. The song was co-written by Europe vocalist Joey Tempest and former Atomic Rooster vocalist/bassist Nick Graham.

An acoustic version of "I'll Cry for You" is included on the compilations 1982–1992, 1982–2000 and Rock the Night: The Very Best of Europe.

The German power metal band Edguy recorded a cover version of the song and included it as a bonus track on the single "Lavatory Love Machine" in 2004, which was released again on the 2008 compilation album, The Singles.

Track listing
"I'll Cry for You"
"Break Free"

Personnel
Joey Tempest − lead vocals
Kee Marcello − guitar, background vocals
John Levén − bass guitar
Mic Michaeli − keyboard, background vocals
Ian Haugland − drums

Chart positions

1991 singles
Europe (band) songs
Number-one singles in Sweden
Songs written by Joey Tempest
Song recordings produced by Beau Hill
1991 songs
Epic Records singles
Songs written by Nick Graham (musician)